The following are the international rankings of Jordan.

Cities
Amman was ranked as a "gamma" world city in The World According to GaWC 2008

Economy

 The Wall Street Journal and the Heritage Foundation: Index of Economic Freedom 2016, ranked 38 out of 179 countries
International Monetary Fund:
GDP (PPP) per capita, 2016, ranked 92nd out of 185 countries.
GDP (nominal), 2016, ranked 89th out of 181 countries.
World Economic Forum: Global Competitiveness Index, 2015-2016, ranked 64th out of 140 countries.

Environment

Yale Center for Environmental Law and Policy and the Center for International Earth Science Information Network: Environmental Performance Index 2016, ranked 74 out of 180 countries.

Globalization

 KOF Swiss Economic Institute: Globalization Index 2018, rated   73.40

Politics

 Transparency International: Corruption Perceptions Index 2020, ranked 60 out of 179 countries
Reporters Without Borders: Press Freedom Index 2020, ranked 128 out of 180 countries
Freedom House: Freedom in the World, 2021 rated  "Not free"

Society

Economist Intelligence Unit Where-to-be-born index 2013 ranked 69th.
Institute for Economics and Peace: Global Peace Index 2015, ranked 71st out of 162 countries
 United Nations Development Programme: Human Development Index 2016, ranked 80th out of 188 countries

Technological
Economist Intelligence Unit e-readiness, 2009, ranked 50th out of 70 countries

References

Jordan